Gunesh Alisafayevna Abasova (Hjuneš Alisafajeŭna Abasava; born 1979), often known simply as Gunesh, is a Belarusian-Azerbaijani singer-songwriter. She represented  in the Turkvision Song Contest 2013 with the song "".

Early life 

Abasova was born in Baranavichy in 1979. She is fluent in Turkish.

Career 

In 2004, Abasova collaborated with Belarusian band Krambambula for their album Radio Krambambula 0.33 FM as a vocalist. She recorded two songs in Azerbaijani for the album.

She has attempted to represent  in the Eurovision Song Contest several times since 2005.

She was awarded the second prize for young pop song performers at the 2005 edition of the Slavianski Bazaar in Vitebsk. She later performed at the 2006 edition to celebrate the festival's 15th anniversary.

In 2011, she was awarded the Medal of Francysk Skaryna by President of Belarus Alexander Lukashenko.

Abasova and her song "" were revealed as the ian entry for the Turkvision Song Contest 2013 in November 2013. The song was written and composed by Abasova herself. Belarus qualified from the semi-final held on 19 December 2013, and placed second in the final on 21 December 2013 with 205 points.

Personal life 

Abasova married her Turkish husband in Istanbul in June 2014. The couple had been engaged since December 2012. She currently resides in Minsk.

Discography

Extended plays

Singles

References 

1979 births
21st-century Belarusian women singers
Azerbaijani-language singers
Belarusian people of Azerbaijani descent
Belarusian singer-songwriters
Living people
People from Baranavichy
Turkish-language singers
Turkvision Song Contest entrants